Crotalarieae is a tribe of flowering plants belonging to the family Fabaceae. It includes rooibos (Aspalathus linearis), harvested for sale as a tisane.

Description
The Crotalarieae arose 31.2 ± 3.4 million years ago (in the Oligocene). The members of this tribe consistently form a monophyletic clade in molecular phylogenetic analyses. The tribe does not currently have a node-based definition and no morphological synapomorphies have been identified. Several genera in the tribe produce quinolizidine alkaloids or macrocyclic pyrrolizidine alkaloids.

Genera
Crotalarieae comprises the following genera:

 Aspalathus L.
 Bolusia Benth.

 Calobota Eckl. & Zeyh.
 Crotalaria L.

 Euchlora Eckl. & Zeyh.
 Ezoloba B.-E. van Wyk & Boatwr.

 Lebeckia Thunb.
 Leobordea Del.

 Listia E. Mey.
 Lotononis (DC.) Eckl. & Zeyh.

 Pearsonia Dummer

 Rafnia Thunb.
 Robynsiophyton R.Wilczek
 Rothia Pers.

 Wiborgia Thunb.
 Wiborgiella Boatwr. & B.-E. van Wyk

References

External links

 
Fabaceae tribes